{{DISPLAYTITLE:C20H21NO}}
The molecular formula C20H21NO (molar mass: 291.39 g/mol, exact mass: 291.1623 u) may refer to:

 Butinoline (Azulone)
 Cotriptyline (SD-2203-01)
 JWH-030
 PRC200-SS

Molecular formulas